Cairns Castle is a ruined keep, dating from the 15th century.

It may have also been known as Easter Cairns Castle, but this may refer to another castle in the area.

History

The Crichtons inherited the castle through marriage of the heiress of the castle who was the granddaughter of William de Carnys the original owner.

Structure

The castle has an adjoining wing.  It has a vaulted basement, a kitchen on the ground floor, and a hall above.  All floors were reached by a turnpike stair in the corner between the main block and the wing.  There were at least three storeys.  The kitchen fireplace was converted into an entrance.  The entrance tower to the east no longer exists.

It has been a Scheduled Monument since 30 November 1981.  It was a category B listed building until it was de-listed in 2015.

References

Castles in West Lothian
Ruins in West Lothian
Scheduled Ancient Monuments in West Lothian